Misophrioida is an order of copepods, containing the following families:
Misophriidae Boxshall & Jaume, 2000
Palpophriidae Boxshall & Jaume, 2000
Speleophriidae Boxshall & Jaume, 2000

References

Copepods
Crustacean orders